Activ was a Romanian europop/eurodance band.  The members (Oana, Rudi and Avi) are from Arad and Timișoara.

Success
The albums Motive and Superstar were quite successful. Hit songs from these albums included "Visez 2004" ("I Dream") from Motive, "Superstar", "Zile cu Tine" ("Days with You") and "Lucruri simple" ("Simple Things") from Superstar.  The album Everyday contains many songs in English included the hit singles: "Reasons", "Without U", "Music Is Drivin Me Crazy", "Feel good" (feat. DJ Optick) and "Under my skin".

The group split in 2010.

Discography

Sunete (1999)
În Transă (2002)
Motive (2004)
Superstar (2005)
Everyday (2007)

External links
 Activ - Official Site
 Forum Activ

Activ